Hottentotta hottentotta, also known by its common name alligatorback scorpion is a species from the genus Hottentotta.  The species was first described in 2000.  The species is found in West Africa. Females are capable of parthenogenesis.

References

Buthidae
Invertebrates of West Africa
Taxa named by Johan Christian Fabricius
Animals described in 1787